Unique College of Medical Science and Hospital (UCOMS), is a medical institution in Rajbiraj, Nepal.  It was established in January 2001 in an eastern city of Nepal Rajbiraj. The governing Body of UCOMS is the Medical Council of Nepal, and the Governing Ministry  is the Ministry of Education & Sports of Nepal. The college has approximate 1600 students. It has 70 teaching and 50 administrative staff on its rolls. The college primarily offers PCL level medical courses. Now the college offering bachelor level courses.

History
The college was established in January 2001.

Medical & Teaching Hospital
 200 bed General Hospital with all medical requirements
 All the required equipment available.
 Additional Specialty equipment for Cardiology already available.

Medical Sciences Education
The academy provides undergraduate and PCL programs in the fields of nursing and medical sciences.
The courses offered by the institute are:
 BPH
 BN
 Staff Nurse (PCL)
 HA (General Medicine)
 DPH
 Lab Technician (LT)
 ANM
 CMA

Research Laboratories
 Pathology
 Pharmacy
 Tissue Culture
 Bio Technology

References

See also
 List of educational institutions in Rajbiraj

Universities and colleges in Nepal
2001 establishments in Nepal
Educational institutions established in 2001